The non-marine molluscs of Tanzania are a part of the molluscan fauna of Tanzania (wildlife of Tanzania).

A number of species of non-marine molluscs are found in the wild in Tanzania.

There are 417 species of land snails in Tanzania.

Freshwater gastropods 
Thiaridae
 Melanoides tuberculata (O. F. Müller, 1774)

Lymnaeidae
 Radix natalensis (Krauss, 1848)

Land gastropods 
Land gastropods in Tanzania include:

Assimineidae - otherwise marine or salt marsh family, the terrestrial assimineid occur in Tanzania
 "Assiminea" aurifera Preston, 1912 - previously Assimania aurifera

Cyclophoridae
 Cyathopoma azaniense Verdcourt, 1978
 Cyathopoma pembense Rowson, 2010 - endemic to Pemba Island

Pomatiidae
 Tropidophora zanguebarica (Petit, 1850)

Veronicellidae
 Laevicaulis alte (Férussac, 1821)
 Laevicaulis striatus (Simroth, 1896)
 Laevicaulis stuhlmanni (Simroth, 1895)

Maizaniidae
 Maizania elatior (Martens, 1892)
 Maizania volkensi (Martens, 1895)

Succineidae
 Quickia concisa (Morelet, 1849)

Valloniidae
 Pupisoma (Ptychopatula) dioscoricola (C. B. Adams, 1845)

Vertiginidae
 Nesopupa (Afripupa) bisulcata (Jickeli, 1873)
 Nesopupa minutalis (Morelet, 1881)
 Gastrocopta klunzingeri (Jickeli, 1873)

Cerastidae
 Edouardia metula (Martens, 1895)
 Gittenedouardia conulina (von Martens, 1869)
 Rachis punctata (Anton, 1839)
 Rhachidina braunsi (von Martens, 1869)

Achatinidae
 Achatina (Lissachatina) allisa Reeve, 1849
 Achatina (Lissachatina) fulica hamillei Petit, 1859
 Limicolaria martensiana (E. A. Smith, 1880)

Ferussaciidae
 Cecilioides callipeplum (Connolly, 1923)
 Cecilioides (Cecilioides) tribulationis (Preston, 1911)

Micractaeonidae
 Micractaeon koptawelilensis (Germain, 1934)

Subulinidae

 Allopeas gracile (Hutton, 1834)
 Curvella subvirescens (E. A. Smith, 1890)
 Kempioconcha terrulenta (Morelet, 1883)
 Opeas delicatum Taylor, 1877
 Opeas lamoense Melvill & Ponsonby, 1892
 Pseudoglessula (Kempioconcha) subolivacea agg. (E. A. Smith, 1890)
 Pseudopeas elgonense Connolly, 1923
 Pseudopeas igembiense Connolly, 1923
 Striosubulina striatella (Rang, 1831)
 Subulina intermedia Taylor, 1877
 Subulina octona (Bruguière, 1789)
 Subulina usambarica K. Pfeiffer - endemic
 Subulona ischna (Pilsbry, 1919)
 Subulona ordinaria Preston, 1910
 Subulona pinguis (Martens, 1895)

Streptaxidae
 Edentulina obesa (Taylor, 1877)
 Edentulina usambarensis Bequaert & Clench - endemic
 Gonaxis (Gonaxis) denticulatus (Dohrn, 1878)
 Gonaxis usambarensis Verdcourt - endemic
 Gonaxis vosseleri Thiele - endemic
 "Gulella" (Aenigmigulella) aenigmatica (E. A. Smith, 1890)
 Gulella baccata (Preston, 1913)
 Gulella gwendolinae (Preston, 1910)
 Gulella (Gulella) laevigata (Dohrn, 1865)
 Gulella jod (Preston, 1910)
 "Gulella" peakei van Bruggen, 1975
 Gulella planidens (von Martens, 1892)
 Gulella (Pupigulella) pupa (Thiele, 1911)
 "Gulella" radius (Preston, 1910)
 Gulella sexdentata (von Martens, 1869)
 Gulella streptostelopsis van Bruggen, 2007
 Ptychotrema (Ennea) pollonerae Preston, 1913
 Streptostele (Raffraya) acicula (Morelet, 1877)
 Streptostele (Raffraya) horei E. A. Smith, 1890
 Tayloria amaniensis Verdcourt - endemic
 Tayloria angustistriata K. Pfeiffer - endemic
 Tayloria hyalinoides Thiele - endemic
 Tayloria shimbiensis Connolly, 1923

Punctidae
 Paralaoma servilis (Shuttleworth, 1852)
 Punctum ugandanum (E. A. Smith, 1903)

Charopidae
 Trachycystis lamellifera (E. A. Smith, 1903)

Euconulidae
 Afroconulus iredalei (Preston, 1912)
 Afroguppya quadrisculpta (Connolly, 1939)
 Afroguppya rumrutiensis (Preston, 1911)
 Afropunctum seminium (Morelet, 1873)
 Microcystina minima (H. Adams, 1867)

Helicarionidae
 Kaliella barrakporensis (L. Pfeiffer, 1852)
 Sitala jenynsi (L. Pfeiffer, 1845)
 Sitala mazumbaiensis Verdcourt

Urocyclidae
 Atoxon pallens Simroth, 1895
 "Dendrolimax" vangoethemi Rowson, 2010
 Elisolimax roebucki (Simroth, 1910)
 Elisolimax rufescens Simroth - endemic
 Leptichnus bernardi van Goethem - endemic
 Pembatoxon insulare van Goethem, 1975
 Thapsia curvatula von Martens, 1897
 Thapsia cf. hanningtoni (E. A. Smith, 1890)
 Thapsia insulsa Preston, 1910
 Trichotoxon heynemanni Simroth, 1888
 Trochonanina mozambicensis (L. Pfeiffer, 1855)
 Trochozonites usambarensis Verdcourt - endemic

Halolimnohelicidae
 Halolimnohelix cf. bukobae (Martens, 1895)
 Halolimnohelix conradti von Martens - endemic

See also
Lists of molluscs of surrounding countries:

 List of non-marine molluscs of Kenya, Wildlife of Kenya
 List of non-marine molluscs of Uganda, Wildlife of Uganda
 List of non-marine molluscs of Rwanda, Wildlife of Rwanda
 List of non-marine molluscs of Burundi, Wildlife of Burundi
 List of non-marine molluscs of the Democratic Republic of the Congo, Wildlife of the Democratic Republic of the Congo
 List of non-marine molluscs of Zambia, Wildlife of Zambia
 List of non-marine molluscs of Malawi, Wildlife of Malawi
 List of non-marine molluscs of Mozambique, Wildlife of Mozambique

oversea countries:
 List of non-marine molluscs of the Seychelles
 List of non-marine molluscs of Madagascar
 List of non-marine molluscs of Mayotte

References

External links 
 Emberton K. C., Pearce T. A., Kasigwa P. F., Tattersfield P. & Habibu Z. (1997). "High diversity and regional endemism in land snails of eastern Tanzania". Biodiversity and Conservation 6(8): 1123–1136. .
 Tattersfield P., Seddon M. B., Meena C., Kayumbo N. & Kasigwa P. (1998). "Ecology and Conservation of the Land-Snails of the Eastern Arc Mountains". Journal of East African Natural History 87(1): 119–138. .
 Tattersfield P., Seddon M. B., Ngereza C. & Rowson B. (2006). "Elevational variation in diversity and composition of land-snail faunas in a Tanzanian forest". African Journal of Ecology 44(1): 47–60. .

M

Molluscs
Tanzania
Tanzania